Mike Beres (born May 13, 1973) is a male badminton player from Canada, who won the bronze medal in the men's doubles competition at the 1999 Pan American Games. He was born in Brantford, Ontario.

2001 (and 2007) he won the Boston Badminton Open. Beres competed in badminton at the 2004 Summer Olympics in mixed doubles with partner Jody Patrick.  They lost to Fredrik Bergström and Johanna Persson of Sweden in the round of 32.

He would later win gold medals in singles and doubles at the 2007 Pan American Games, as well as a silver in mixed Badminton with Valerie Loker. Beres has won 8 Canadian National Championships between 1998 and 2007, two of them in men's singles, four in men's doubles and two in mixed doubles.

Beres has also competed in the 2000 Olympics and qualified for the August 2008 Olympic Games in Beijing for mixed doubles. Beres was coached by Edith Hayman, a former Ottawa District Badminton Association (ODBA) champion.

Mike Beres currently resides in Ottawa, Ontario where he occasionally frequents at the RA Centre, a badminton training/playing facility, which is an affiliated member of the ODBA. However, he has officially retired after playing badminton for Canada in the 2008 Summer Olympics.

References

Sources

External links
 
 
 
 
 

1973 births
Living people
Badminton players at the 2000 Summer Olympics
Badminton players at the 2004 Summer Olympics
Badminton players at the 2007 Pan American Games
Badminton players at the 2008 Summer Olympics
Canadian male badminton players
Olympic badminton players of Canada
Racket sportspeople from Ontario
Sportspeople from Brantford
Sportspeople from Ottawa
Badminton players at the 1999 Pan American Games
Badminton players at the 2003 Pan American Games
Pan American Games gold medalists for Canada
Pan American Games silver medalists for Canada
Pan American Games bronze medalists for Canada
Pan American Games medalists in badminton
Commonwealth Games competitors for Canada
Badminton players at the 2006 Commonwealth Games
Badminton players at the 1998 Commonwealth Games
Medalists at the 1999 Pan American Games
Medalists at the 2003 Pan American Games
Medalists at the 2007 Pan American Games